Mountain House High School  is a four-year, public high school located in the town of Mountain House near Tracy, California. On July 17, 2012, Lammersville Joint Unified School District broke ground on construction. The school opened in the Fall of 2014.

Academics 
Mountain House High School offers Honors and Advanced Placement (AP) courses and professional pathways in Biomedical Sciences, Business, Computer Science, Engineering, Culinary and Catering, and Dance.   The Superintendent is Dr. Kirk Nicholas.

AP Courses 

 AP Biology
 AP Calculus AB
 AP Calculus BC
 AP Computer Science A
 AP Computer Science Principles
 AP English Language & Composition
 AP English Literature & Composition
 AP Environmental Science
 AP Human Geography
 AP Macroeconomics
 AP Physics C
 AP Psychology
 AP Spanish Language & Culture
 AP Statistics
 AP Studio Art
 AP US History
 AP US Government & Politics
 AP World History

References 

High schools in San Joaquin County, California
Public high schools in California
Tracy, California
2014 establishments in California